Swingin' for the Fences is the debut album by Gordon Goodwin's Big Phat Band, an 18-piece big band led by Gordon Goodwin.

Goodwin composed the music except for "Two-Part Invention in D Minor", a jazz update of J. S. Bach. He wrote the arrangements and played alto and soprano saxophone. "Sing Sang Sung" is based on "Sing, Sing, Sing", which was written by Louis Prima and made famous by Benny Goodman's big band.

There are solos by the Big Phat Band's Dan Higgins on saxophone, Andy Martin on trombone, Tom Ranier on piano, and Goodwin on saxophone. Guests include Arturo Sandoval, Eric Marienthal, Eddie Daniels, and Brandon Fields.

Swingin' for the Fences received two Grammy Award nominations. It was the first album released on DVD-Audio and the first DVD-Audio to be nominated for two Grammy Awards.

Track listing
All compositions are by Gordon Goodwin except "Bach Two-Part Invention in D Minor" by Johann Sebastian Bach and Gordon Goodwin.

References

Gordon Goodwin's Big Phat Band albums
2001 debut albums